Bukhāʾ is a Wilayat and town in the Muhafazah of Musandam in the Sultanate of Oman. It is home to Bukha Castle.

Sister towns 
 Weʽa, Djibouti

References

See also 
 Dibba Al-Baya
 Madha
 Khasab
 Kumzar
 Ras Al Khaimah in the UAE

Populated places in Oman
Musandam Governorate